Mary Staunton is an Irish singer and accordion player.

A native of County Mayo, Staunton released her first album in 1998. Her second, Circle of Friends, was launched in County Galway in July 2010. Circle of Friends was launched at Connolly's pub, Kinvara, by actor Brendan Gleeson, whose fiddle playing features on the CD. It was produced by Alec Finn of De Dannan, who also appears on the album. Other featured artists include John Prine, Rick Epping and Mary Shannon.

As of 2010, Staunton lived in Maree, Oranmore. She is married to Jerry Mulvihill, a banjo player. They have two children.

Discography

 Bright Early Mornings, 1998.
 Circle of Friends, 2010.

References

Musicians from County Mayo
Musicians from County Galway
Irish women singers
Living people
Year of birth missing (living people)